Crotalaria peduncularis is a species of herbaceous plant in the subfamily Faboideae. It is found in India.

References

External links
 Crotalaria peduncularis at Tropicos
 gbif.org

peduncularis
Plants described in 1834